A horse's neck is an American cocktail recognised by the IBA, identifiably sporting a long, curling strip of lemon rind.

Mixture
It is made with brandy (or sometimes bourbon) and ginger ale, with a long spiral of lemon peel draped over the edge of an old fashioned glass or a highball glass. A similar Canadian drink, the rye and ginger, is made with Canadian whisky and ginger ale.

History
Dating back to the 1890s, it was a non-alcoholic mixture of ginger ale, ice and lemon peel. By the 1910s, brandy, or bourbon would be added for a "horse's neck with a kick" or a "stiff horse's neck". The non-alcoholic version was still served in upstate New York in the late 1950s and early 60s, but eventually it was phased out. IBA classifies this drink as a long drink.

See also
Buck (cocktail)
List of cocktails
List of IBA official cocktails

Bibliography

Cocktails with bitters
Cocktails with brandy
Cocktails with ginger ale
Sweet cocktails